Klemens Franz de Paula, Prince of Bavaria (Munich, 19 April 1722 – Munich, 6 August 1770) was the son of the Imperial Field Marshal, Ferdinand of Bavaria (1699–1738), and the grandson of Maximilian II Emanuel, Elector of Bavaria.

He married on 17 January 1742 Maria Anna, Pfalzgräfin von der Pfalz (1722–1790), daughter of
Joseph Charles of Bavaria, Count Palatine and Prince Hereditary of Sulzbach and Countess Palatine Elizabeth Augusta Sophie of Neuburg, They had two sons and two daughters, all of them died shortly after birth:

Duchess Maria of Bavaria (b. and d. 30 September 1748).
A son (b. and d. 31 May 1754).
Duchess Maria Anna of Bavaria (b. and d. 28 January 1755).
A son (b. and d. 23 June 1756).

If one of his sons had lived, he would have become Prince-elector of Bavaria in 1777 after the death of Maximilian III Joseph.

Sources 
 Oskar Klausner (ed.): Die Familie der Pfälzischen Wittelsbacher. Staatliches Liegenschaftsamt Heidelberg, 1995.
 GeneaNet.org

House of Wittelsbach
1722 births
1770 deaths
Burials at the Theatine Church, Munich
Nobility from Munich
Knights of the Golden Fleece of Spain